The 1984 United States Senate election in Colorado was held on November 6, 1984. Incumbent Republican William L. Armstrong defeated Democrat nominee Nancy E. Dick with 64.25% of the vote. Armstrong carried all but three counties in the state, and to date is the last Republican Senate candidate to carry normally heavily Democratic Denver.

Primary elections
Primary elections were held on September 11, 1984.

Democratic primary

Candidates
Nancy E. Dick, incumbent Lieutenant Governor
Carlos F. Lucero, attorney

Results

Republican primary

Candidates
William L. Armstrong, incumbent United States Senator

Results

General election

Candidates
Major party candidates
William L. Armstrong, Republican
Nancy E. Dick, Democratic

Other candidates
Craig Green, Libertarian
David Martin, Socialist Workers
Earl Higgerson, Prohibition

Results

See also
 1984 United States Senate elections

References

1984
Colorado
United States Senate